995 Sternberga is a main-belt asteroid discovered in 1923 by Sergei Belyavsky at Simeiz Observatory. It was named after Russian astronomer Pavel Shternberg.

Photometric observations of this asteroid collected during 2004 show a rotation period of 15.26 ± 0.01 hours with a brightness variation of 0.15 ± 0.03 magnitude.

References

External links 
 
 

000995
Discoveries by Sergei Belyavsky
Named minor planets
19230608